Heinrich Albert may relate to:

Heinrich Albert (composer) (1604–1651), German composer
Heinrich Albert (guitarist) (1870–1950), German guitarist and composer
Heinrich Albert (1874–1960), German politician, businessman and lawyer

See also
Heinrich Albertz (1915–1993), German theologian and politician